Due to Einstein's prolific output, the term Einstein effect may refer to any one of a large number of possible effects in different fields of physics.

These may include:
 Gravitational redshift
 Gravitational lensing

and more specifically, 
 The Bose-Einstein effect
 The Einstein-de Haas effect

See also
 List of things named after Albert Einstein